The 1934 West Virginia Mountaineers football team was an American football team that represented West Virginia University as an independent during the 1934 college football season. In its first season under head coach Charles Tallman, the team compiled a 6–4 record and outscored opponents by a total of 117 to 113. The team played its home games at Mountaineer Field in Morgantown, West Virginia. Herbert Stewart and John Vargo were the team captains.

Schedule

References

West Virginia
West Virginia Mountaineers football seasons
West Virginia Football